

Walter Denkert (23 February 1897 – 9 July 1982) was a German general during World War II. He was a recipient of the Knight's Cross of the Iron Cross of Nazi Germany.

Awards and decorations

 German Cross in Gold (8 March 1945)
 Knight's Cross of the Iron Cross on 14 May 1944 as Oberst and commander of 19. Panzer-Division

References

Citations

Bibliography

 

1897 births
1982 deaths
Military personnel from Kiel
Lieutenant generals of the German Army (Wehrmacht)
German Army personnel of World War I
Recipients of the clasp to the Iron Cross, 1st class
Recipients of the Gold German Cross
Recipients of the Knight's Cross of the Iron Cross
German prisoners of war in World War II held by the United States
People from the Province of Schleswig-Holstein
20th-century Freikorps personnel